The International Commerce Centre (ICC) is a 108-storey (top floor 118),  supertall skyscraper in West Kowloon, Hong Kong. It is a part of the Union Square project on top of Kowloon station.

It was the 4th tallest building in the world (3rd in Asia) when its construction was completed in 2010; as of March 2023, it is the world's 13th tallest building by height, world's 10th tallest building by number of floors, and the tallest building in Hong Kong.

Notable amenities include the world's 3rd highest hotel (The Ritz-Carlton, Hong Kong),  Skydining 101, and Sky100.

"ICC" faces the 2nd tallest skyscraper in Hong Kong, the 2 International Finance Centre (2 IFC) directly across Victoria Harbour in Central, Hong Kong Island. "2 IFC" was also developed by Sun Hung Kai Properties, along with another major Hong Kong developer, Henderson Land.

Development
MTR Corporation Limited and Sun Hung Kai Properties, Hong Kong's metro operator and largest property developer, were responsible for development of this skyscraper. Known in development as Union Square Phase 7, its current name was officially announced in 2005.

"ICC" was completed in phases from 2007 to 2010, and opened in 2011, with The Ritz-Carlton, Hong Kong opening in late March and the observatory in early April.

The height had been scaled back from the earlier plans due to regulations that did not allow buildings to be taller than the surrounding mountains. It would have risen  over the "2 IFC".

The tower was designed by the American architectural firm Kohn Pedersen Fox Associates (KPF) in association with Wong & Ouyang.

Construction work was temporarily halted on 13 September 2009, due to a lift shaft accident that killed six workers.

Floor count
Including 108 above grounds and 4 below.  Due to prevalence of tetraphobia in Hong Kong, floors that would have included the number "4" and “13” (4, 13, 14, 24, 34, 44 etc…) were omitted. Therefore, it is marketed as "118-storey"!

28 floors were skipped : 4, 5, 6, 7, 13, 14, 23, 24, 26, 28, 29, 33, 34, 43, 44, 53, 54, 63, 64, 73, 74, 83, 84, 93, 94, 104, 105, 114

18 floors were added : UG, M1-1, M1-2, M1-3, M1-5, R1, R2, M2-1, M2-2, R3, M3-1, M3-2, R4, M4-1, M4-2, M4-3, M5, M6

Floor directory
Sky100 situated on level 100, which opened in April 2011. Visitors may reach to the observation deck from level 2 in 67 seconds; a large shopping mall, Elements, also on level 2.

A five-star hotel,  The Ritz-Carlton, Hong Kong occupies 20 floors (3 to 9, M4-3 to 118). The world's highest swimming pool and bar (Ozone) can be found on the top floor 118.

The ICC Light and Music Show
The LED light show set a new Guinness World Record for the “largest light and sound show on a single building” using a total of 50,000 square metres on two facades of the International Commerce Centre.

The ICC Light and Music Show is designed by lighting designer Hirohito Totsune who already designed the lighting system of the Tokyo Skytree. Similar to the daily “A Symphony of Lights Show” in Victoria Harbour, the ICC Light and Music Show creates a theme and storyline using light and music elements.

Gallery

See also 
 List of tallest buildings in Hong Kong
 List of tallest buildings in China
 List of tallest buildings

References

External links 

 
 Article about the International Commerce Centre in Building Journal, April 2011.
 Elements shopping mall official website
 Wong & Ouyang (HK) Ltd., "More than half-a-century of architectural design experience in Hong Kong", section "International Commerce Centre and The Cullinan", pp. 31–33, September 2009

2010 establishments in Hong Kong
Office buildings completed in 2010
Commercial buildings completed in 2011
Kohn Pedersen Fox buildings
MTR Corporation
Skyscraper office buildings in Hong Kong
Sun Hung Kai Properties
Union Square (Hong Kong)
West Kowloon